Richard Bradford may refer to:

 Richard Bradford (novelist) (1932–2002), American novelist
 Richard Bradford (actor) (1934–2016), American actor
 Richard Bradford (priest) (1913–1980), Archdeacon of Carlisle, 1970–1978